James Martin (born August 21, 1944) is a former American football coach.  He was the 13th head football coach at Tuskegee University  in Tuskegee, Alabama and he held that position for ten seasons, from 1984 until 1993.  His coaching record at Tuskegee was 47–50–2.

References

1944 births
Living people
Tuskegee Golden Tigers football coaches